The 1939–40 Ljubljana Subassociation League was the 21st season of the Ljubljana Subassociation League. Železničar Maribor won the league for the second time, defeating I. SSK Maribor in the final.

Celje subdivision

Ljubljana subdivision

Maribor subdivision

Quarter-final

Semi-final

Final

References

External links
Football Association of Slovenia 

Slovenian Republic Football League seasons
Yugo
2
Football
Football